The diocese of Hải Phòng is a Roman Catholic diocese in northern Vietnam. The bishop is Vincent Nguyên Văn Ban, since 2022.

The creation of the diocese in its present form was declared 24 November 1960. The earliest forms of Roman Catholic institutions appeared in that territory since 1655, with French and Spanish missionaries until the middle of the 20th century.

The diocese covers an area of 10,000 km², and is a suffragan diocese of the Archdiocese of Hanoi.

By 2004, the diocese of Hai Phòng had about 113,092 believers (2.4% of the population), 29 priests and 62 parishes.

Queen of the Rosary Cathedral in Hai Phong has been assigned as the Cathedral of the diocese.

Many migrant workers from other regions of Vietnam, who work in that busy port city, attend masses in Hai Phong.

In 2008, the Bishop of Hai Phong Diocese Joseph Vu Van Thien took part in World Youth Day 2008 in Sydney, Australia, where he presented a speech at the Homily at the Opening Mass for Vietnamese Youth.

Bishops
François Deydier, M.E.P. (25 November 1678 – 1 July 1693 Died) 
Raimondo Lezzoli, O.P. (20 October 1696 – 18 January 1706 Died) 
Juan a Santa Cruz, O.P. (3 April 1716 – 14 August 1721 Died) 
Thomas Bottaro (Thomas a Sestri Bottaro), O.P. (14 August 1721 – 8 August 1737 Died) 
Hilario a Jesu Costa, O.A.D. (8 April 1737 – 31 March 1754 Died) 
Santiago Hernández, O.P. (13 August 1757 – 6 February 1777 Died) 
Manuel Obellar, O.P. (29 January 1778 – 7 September 1789 Died) 
Feliciano Alonso, O.P. (1 October 1790 – 2 February 1799 Died) 
Ignacio Clemente Delgado Cebrián, O.P. (2 February 1799 – 12 July 1838 Died) 
Jerónimo Hermosilla, O.P. (2 August 1839 – 1 November 1861 Died) 
Hilarión Alcázar, O.P. (1 November 1861 – 15 October 1870 Died) 
Antonio Colomer, O.P. (11 February 1870–1 June1883, Apostolic Vicar of Northern Tonking) 
José Terrés, O.P. (1 June 1883 – 2 April 1906 Died) 
Nicasio Arellano, O.P. (23 April 1906 – 14 April 1919 Resigned) 
Francisco Ruiz de Azúa Ortiz de Zárate, O.P. (14 April 1919 – 22 May 1929 Died) 
Alejandro García y Fontcuberta, O.P. (31 May 1930 – 14 February 1933 Died) 
Francisco Gomez de Santiago, O.P. (18 February 1933 – 1952 Resigned) 
Joseph Truong-cao-Dai, O.P. (8 January 1953 – 1960 Resigned) 
Pierre Khuât-Vañ-Tao (24 November 1960 – 19 August 1977 Died) 
Joseph Nguyên Tùng Cuong (10 January 1979 – 10 February 1999 Died) 
Joseph Vũ Văn Thiên (26 November 2002 – 17 November 2018 Appointed Archbishop of Hanoi)
Vincent Nguyên Văn Ban (19 March 2022 – Present)

References

Hai Phong
Haiphong
Christian organizations established in 1960
Roman Catholic dioceses and prelatures established in the 20th century
Hai Phong, Roman Catholic Diocese of
1960 establishments in North Vietnam